The 1993–94 Macedonian Football Cup was the 2nd season of Macedonia's football knockout competition. FK Vardar were the defending champions, having won their first title. The 1993–94 champions were FK Sileks who won their second title.

Competition calendar

Sources:

First round

|}
Source:

Second round

|}
Source:

Quarter-finals

|}

Sources:

Semi-finals

|}
Sources:

Final

See also
1993–94 Macedonian First Football League
1993–94 Macedonian Second Football League

References

External links
 1993–94 Macedonian Football Cup at rsssf.org

Macedonia
Cup
Macedonian Football Cup seasons